Yengabad is a city in Isfahan Province, Iran.

Yengabad may also refer to:
 Yengabad-e Chay, East Azerbaijan Province
 Yengabad-e Kuh, East Azerbaijan Province
 Yengabad, Hamadan
 Yengabad, Zanjan